In Search of Fellini is a 2017 coming-of-age adventure movie, directed by Taron Lexton, starring Ksenia Solo, Maria Bello and Mary Lynn Rajskub. The movie was inspired by the early years in the entertainment industry and a journey to Italy to “find herself”  of Nancy Cartwright (whose Spotted Cow Entertainment sold the North American rights to AMBI Media Group).

Plot

A shy small-town Ohio girl who loves movies but dislikes reality, discovers the delightfully bizarre films of Federico Fellini, and sets off on a strange, beautiful journey across Italy to find him.

Cast

Reception
On review aggregator website Rotten Tomatoes, the film has an 89% approval rating based on 9 reviews, with an average ranking of 6.1/10. On Metacritic, the film has a weighted average score of 55 out of a 100 based on 5 critics, indicating "mixed or average reviews".

Monica Castillo of The New York Times called it "a charming drama about the love of movies and youthful passion".

Katie Walsh of the Los Angeles Times sassily wrote of the film: "The plot makes not a lick of sense, but the imagery is striking, and the adoration of Fellini's films comes through loud and clear".

The staff-written review in The Hollywood Reporter concluded: "Where the final minutes of the movie suffer from clumsy storytelling, most of what precedes them sits well within the romantic finding-oneself comfort zone, and Solo, while not able to imbue her character with Amelie-like spark, helps keep things from getting treacly."

References

External links

Films set in 2020
American coming-of-age films
American romance films
2010s adventure films
2010s romance films
Federico Fellini
2010s English-language films
2010s American films